Gustave Olivier Lannes de Montebello (born 4 December 1804 in Paris; died 29 August 1875 in Château de Blosseville, Pennedepie) was a French general and politician. He was the fourth and last son of Marshal Jean Lannes.

Gallery

References

1804 births
1875 deaths
French Senators of the Second Empire
French generals
People of the First Italian War of Independence